Imehrou (also known as Imihrou) is a village in the commune of Illizi, in Illizi Province, Algeria. The village is the site of a project to introduce solar energy to Algeria, with 33 households connected to 5 solar power systems.

References

Neighbouring towns and cities

Populated places in Illizi Province